Thomas Garfit (1815 – 29 May 1883) was a British Conservative Party politician.

He was elected as a Member of Parliament (MP) for the borough of Boston in Lincolnshire at an unopposed by-election in August 1878, after the resignation of the Conservative MP John Wingfield Malcolm. Garfit was re-elected at the 1880 general election, but an election petition was lodged against the result, and the election was declared void on 3 August 1880. The writ was suspended, and  a royal commission was established to investigate elections in the borough.

References

External links 
 

1815 births
1883 deaths
Conservative Party (UK) MPs for English constituencies
UK MPs 1874–1880
UK MPs 1880–1885